Quercus canbyi (Canby oak, Sierra oak), synonyms including Quercus graciliformis, is a North American species of oak tree.

Description
It starts as a pyramidal form and then matures into an open irregular shape.

The petioles can have a reddish hue. It blooms in March and the acorns are then seen in August.

It has been distinguished from Quercus graciliformis by its twig shape and by producing acorns biennially rather than annually; however , Plants of the World Online regards them as synonymous.

Taxonomy
Quercus canbyi was first described by William Trelease in 1924. It is placed in Quercus section Lobatae.

Distribution
The species has been found only in Texas and in northeast Mexico.

Conservation
Quercus canbyi was assessed in 2016 for the IUCN Red List as "least concern". Quercus graciliformis, regarded as a synonym by Plants of the World Online, was assessed as "critically endangered" in 2016.

Cultivation
Quercus canbyi will tolerate most kinds of soils and is used in gardens to provide shade.

References

canbyi
Flora of Texas
Trees of Northeastern Mexico
Flora of the Sierra Madre Oriental
Oaks of Mexico
Plants described in 1924
Taxa named by William Trelease